Avellaneda is a municipality of Spain in the province of Ávila, autonomous community of Castile and León. It is in the judicial district of Piedrahita.

It has an area of 10.39 km², a population of 40 (2004) and population density of 3.85 people per km². It is in the region of Alto Tormes. 

Before the provincial reorganization in 1833, it was part of the province of Salamanca, like the rest of Alto Tormes.

, the mayor was Vicente Martín Hernández.

References

Municipalities in the Province of Ávila